Lannes is a surname. Notable people with the surname include:

 Carlos Lannes (born 1979), Argentine cross-country skier
 Henriette H. Lannes, central historical figure in the Gurdjieff Foundation
 Jean Lannes, duke of Montebello (1769–1809), Marshal of France
 Louis Napoléon Lannes (1801–1874), French diplomat and politician
 Roberta Lannes (born 1948), American writer